is a Japanese manga artist who is known for creating the manga series Kamen Rider Spirits. He is married to fellow manga artist .

History
After working as an assistant to manga artist Satoshi Yoshida, Muraeda made his debut in 1987 with Arm a Champion (Weekly Shōnen Sunday extra issue, November).

He has been a childhood friend since kindergarten with Fumiaki Tatesako, who was in charge of the manga adaptation of Gyōten Ningen Batseelor. He is known for his friendship with many manga artists who have serialized their works in Weekly Shōnen Sunday, including Katsutoshi Kawai, Kōji Kumeta, Takashi Shiina, and Kazuhiro Fujita, and is also friends with voice actor Tomokazu Seki.

In the spring of 2012, Muraeda moved from Tokyo to his hometown in Ashikita, Kumamoto Prefecture.

Works
 "Koujirou" (1990)
 "Oretachi no Field" (1992)
 "Red" (1998)
 "Kamoshika!" (1999)
 "Kamen Rider Spirits" (2001–2009)
 "Muraeda Kenichi Tanpenshuu" (2002)
 "Seinaru Yoru ni Sanposuru" (2005)
 "Tentou Pirates" (2007)
 "The End Kajin" (2007)
 "Z-End" (2009)
 "Shin Kamen Rider Spirits" (2009)

References

External links
 
 Kenichi Muraeda at Media Arts Database 

Living people
Manga artists from Kumamoto Prefecture
1967 births